Messay Dego (born February 15, 1986) is an Ethiopian-born Israeli former association footballer and a manager, who played for the Israel U21 national team.

Early life
Dego was born in Addis Ababa, Ethiopia, to an Ethiopian-Jewish family. He immigrated to Israel in the 1990s, with his parents and brothers. His eldest brother Baruch Dego is also a former association footballer, who played for the Israel national team.

References

External links
Stats at ONE

1986 births
Living people
Ethiopian Jews
Ethiopian emigrants to Israel
Citizens of Israel through Law of Return
Jewish Israeli sportspeople
Israeli footballers
Footballers from Ashdod
Hapoel Tel Aviv F.C. players
Hapoel Ashkelon F.C. players
F.C. Ashdod players
Hapoel Ra'anana A.F.C. players
Sektzia Ness Ziona F.C. players
Hapoel Rishon LeZion F.C. players
Maccabi Herzliya F.C. players
AEP Paphos FC players
Hapoel Katamon Jerusalem F.C. players
Israeli expatriate footballers
Expatriate footballers in Cyprus
Israeli expatriate sportspeople in Cyprus
Israeli football managers
Israeli Premier League players
Hapoel Kfar Saba F.C. managers
Hapoel Ashkelon F.C. managers
Hapoel Petah Tikva F.C. managers
Hapoel Ironi Kiryat Shmona F.C. managers
Hapoel Acre F.C. managers
Israeli Premier League managers
Association football midfielders
People from Addis Ababa